Nico Tyrone Harrison (born December 28, 1972) is an American professional basketball executive in the National Basketball Association (NBA), who is currently the president of basketball operations and general manager of the Dallas Mavericks. Prior to that, Harrison was an executive at Nike, Inc., where he worked for 19 years. Harrison also had a five-year professional basketball playing career spanning stints in Belgium, Japan, the Continental Basketball Association, and Lebanon. Harrison played college basketball for the United States Army Black Knights at West Point as well as for the Montana State Bobcats.

Early life
Harrison was born in Seattle, Washington and was raised in both Spokane, Washington and Tigard, Oregon. He is the son of Steve and Christie Harrison, and was the fourth of their five children. Harrison's parents divorced when he was five years old, which led him to split time between Washington and Oregon while growing up. As a child, Harrison played both American football and basketball, before shifting his focus solely to basketball in ninth grade. Harrison eventually decided to attend Tigard High School in Oregon, after determining it would be best for his ability to earn a basketball scholarship to attend college.

College career

Army
Over the final two years of his high school career, Harrison suffered a broken ankle and torn thumb cartilage, which prevented him from being able to play for a Pac-10 school, instead opting to enroll at West Point. In his freshman year of college in 1991, Harrison averaged 9.7 points and 3.8 rebounds per game for the Black Knights.

Montana State
Following his first year at West Point, Harrison decided to transfer to Montana State University. Due to NCAA transfer rules, Harrison was required to sit out of the 1992-93 NCAA season. In three seasons with the Bobcats between 1993 and 1996, Harrison scored over 1000 points, averaging 12 points per game, 2.4 assists per game, and 4.2 rebounds per game. In his senior year in 1996, Harrison helped lead the Bobcats to the NCAA tournament. Harrison was selected to the first team All-Big Sky Conference in each of his three years with the Bobcats. Harrison graduated with a degree in biological and medical sciences and was recognized for his academic successes, being named a two-time Arthur Ashe Jr. Scholar-Athlete award winner while at Montana State.

In 2015, Harrison was inducted into the Montana State Bobcats Hall of Fame.

Career at Nike
Following the end of his playing career, Harrison moved back to Oregon, where he  took up a job as a pharmaceutical sales representative. In 2002, a friend informed him of an open position at Nike, Inc. for a regional field representative for the NBA. Harrison applied and was hired, moving to Dallas, Texas, where the job was based. As part of the role, Harrison represented players such as Michael Finley, Dirk Nowitzki, Tim Duncan, and Jermaine O'Neal. In 2003, Harrison was promoted to a national marketing role with Nike, where he worked with some of the most prominent basketball stars in the world including Michael Jordan, Kobe Bryant, Jason Kidd, and LeBron James. Harrison was eventually promoted to the role of Vice President of North American basketball operations, where he worked until 2021. Over his 19 years at Nike, Harrison became known for his trustworthiness and ability to develop personal connections, making him a popular figure with NBA players.

Personal life
Harrison has four siblings, three older and one younger: Joe, Elizabeth, Shivaun, and Brandon. Harrison is married to Darlise Harrison, a producer for ABC News and BET. They have two daughters, Nia and Noelle.

References

1972 births
Living people
People from Tigard, Oregon
Sportspeople from Seattle
Dallas Mavericks executives